The .257 Weatherby Magnum is a .257 caliber (6.53 mm) belted bottlenecked cartridge. It is one of the original standard length magnums developed by shortening the .375 H&H Magnum case to approx. . Of the cartridges developed by Roy Weatherby, the .257 Weatherby Magnum was known to have been his favorite, and the cartridge currently ranks third in Weatherby cartridge sales, after the .30-378 Weatherby Magnum and the .300 Weatherby Magnum.

The .257 Weatherby Magnum is capable of firing a  Nosler Ballistic Tip bullet at  generating  of energy which is comparable to factory loadings of the .30-06 Springfield and the .35 Whelen in terms of energy.

Discrepancies between the metric and U.S. diameters of the bullet may cause some confusion. A .257 bullet has a metric bullet diameter of 6.53 mm. However, in Europe cartridge designation nomenclature for a large part relies on the bore diameter. As the bore diameter of the .257 Weatherby Magnum is .250 inches this would make it a 6.35 mm caliber cartridge which uses 6.5 mm bullets (not to be confused with 6.5 mm caliber cartridges which use 6.7 mm/.264" bullets).

Cartridge history
The .257 Weatherby Magnum was designed in 1944 and introduced commercially in 1945 by Roy Weatherby as a wildcat cartridge as a chambering in his rifles. The 257 Weatherby Magnum is one of Roy Weatherby's favorite calibers.   The original cartridge was developed using the H&H Super 30 (a close variant of the .300 H&H Magnum which in turn is based on the .375 H&H Magnum) shortened, blown out, and necked down to accept a .25 caliber (6.35 mm) bullet. Together with the .270 Weatherby Magnum, the 7mm Weatherby Magnum, and the .300 Weatherby Magnum, the .257 Weatherby Magnum were the earliest cartridges introduced by Roy Weatherby.

The original cartridges were formed using Winchester's .300 H&H Magnum (H&H Super 30) and was only available as a component from Weatherby. Beginning in 1948 Weatherby began offering loaded ammunition for the .257 Weatherby Magnum cartridge which was loaded in house. Until then the cartridge was only available as a component brass which would require being loaded before use. Sometime later, the .257 Weatherby brass was manufactured by Richard Speer for Weatherby. However, due to space and organizational constraints Weatherby began looking for a source of ammunition for his cartridge. The search culminated in 1951 with Norma Projektilfabrik being awarded a contract to produce ammunition. Since then, all Weatherby Ammunition has been manufactured by Norma with the exception of a brief period of time between 1963 and 1964 when production moved to RWS/Dynamit-Nobel, a company which had entered into partnership with Weatherby.

Ever since the release of the .257 Weatherby Magnum it has remained one of the more popular cartridges in terms of Weatherby sales. Gun writers such as Layne Simpson consider the .257 Weatherby one of his favorite long range cartridges.

Design and specifications
The .257 Weatherby Magnum shares the same cartridge case as the .270 Weatherby Magnum and the 7mm Weatherby Magnum. The .30 Super Belted Rimless H&H manufactured by Winchester served as the direct parent cartridge for the case design. The .257 Weatherby Magnum was one of the first cartridges which used the shortened, blown out and necked down .375 H&H Magnum case and served as the forerunner to the standard length magnum cartridges such as the 7mm Remington Magnum and the .338 Winchester Magnum. There has been some speculation that Roy Weatherby may have used the full length .375 H&H Magnum case if he had slow burning powders available today when the cartridge was designed. The shortening of the case allowed for the more efficient use of the slow powder of the day, IMR 4350; a powder which would not have provided any great advantage for such cartridges as the .257 Weatherby Magnum or the .270 Weatherby Magnum if such cartridges utilized the full length H&H case. Today, IMR 4350 is considered too fast a burning propellant for the cartridge which comes into its own with the slowest burning powders now available.

Both SAAMI and the CIP have published specification for the cartridge. The CIP standards for the cartridge were published in January 1994.

.257 Weatherby Magnum SAAMI compliant schematic. All dimensions in inches [millimeters].

The .257 Weatherby Magnum has a case capacity of 84 gr. of water (5.45 cm3).

The .257 Weatherby Magnum features the Weatherby double radius shoulder. The shoulder continuously curves and transitions from the body radius to the neck radius at the point of tangency at the shoulder between the two radii.  The SAAMI dimensions for the cartridge reflect this implementation of shoulder to neck transition. While the CIP recognizes the correct radii for both the r1 and r2 values, they treat the transition from the body to shoulder and neck to shoulder as filet radii. For this reason the body and neck dimensions are lengthened and a shoulder angle provided. The treatment of the body-shoulder-neck transition zone accounts for the inconsistencies between SAAMI and CIP official dimensions for the cartridge.

Performance

The .257 Weatherby is known for its long range performance and is considered an accurate flat shooting cartridge. Initially due to the cartridge's high velocity the cartridge exhibits less bullet drop than most other cartridges. However, due to lower ballistic coefficients of these bullets, velocity (and therefore energy) is shed more quickly.

Thus no hold over is necessary when shooting at game at these ranges given that the rifles is zeroed correctly to accomplish this task.

Compared to the Winchester's .270 WSM SXP270S ammunition show a bullet drop of  but retains . The N257115BST bullet retains enough energy to be effective on deer out to  while the SXP270S's bullet extends this range out by a further  although both the Weatherby's and Winchester's ammunition start with roughly the same muzzle energy.

Weatherby guarantees a 1.5 MOA accuracy with their ammunition in a Weatherby rifle, .99 MOA or better with their Sub-MOA Vanguard rifles, and .99 MOA or better with the new Vanguard Series 2 Rifles.

Sporting usage
The .257 Weatherby is a hunting cartridge and has not, to a significant extent, been adopted into any other shooting discipline. Due to the cartridge's use of lighter bullets of a quarter bore diameter it should be restricted to medium game species. The cartridge comes into its own where shooting over long distances is anticipated. This is especially true in major grasslands such as prairies, steppes, Pampas, or savannah; or in mountainous terrain such as the Rockies, Alps or the Himalayas.

The .257 Weatherby makes an ideal pronghorn cartridge. Due to the habitat of the species and its wariness, shooting distances are generally longer than for other species in North America. Bullets which open quickly and have a weight ranging between  such as the Nosler Ballistic Tip bullet are excellent choices for this game species.

The cartridge is an excellent choice for smaller deer species such as whitetail and mule deer. These deer species are typically larger and tougher than the pronghorn antelope and may require a slightly heavier bullet.

The cartridge has had success against mountain sheep and goat whether it be in the Alps, Rockies, Caucasus, Pamir or the Himalayas. Shooting distances are typically long, and the .257 Weatherby is able to reach out to the long ranges required to take the game.

Should the cartridge be employed for plains game in Africa, use should be restricted to game species under . The cartridge is effective against smaller plains game species such as gemsbok, waterbuck, nyala and impala.

The .257 Weatherby is used as an ideal small predator cartridge for animals such as lynx, cougar, bobcat, fox, coyote, and wolverine, all of which are taken yearly with the cartridge. While the .257 Weatherby can be employed as an effective varmint round, the cost per cartridge and the muzzle blast precludes its use as a varmint cartridge in large numbers. Furthermore, barrel heating and wear are a consideration when employing the .257 Weatherby for such duties where one would shoot long strings of shots in a short period of time. Due to the cartridge's high velocity and use of lightly constructed bullets, the use of the cartridge as a small game cartridge is not recommended as there are far better choices available which do not destroy the meat as the .257 Weatherby does. If solids or FMJ bullets are used this should not be an issue with regard to small game intended for the table.

Roy Weatherby took the .257 Weatherby Magnum to Africa and took an African Cape buffalo with a single shot to prove to himself that it could be done. Although the cartridge has been used against lion and bears, the cartridge is ill-suited for dangerous game species as it lacks bullets with good weights and sectional densities to be considered an even moderately effective cartridge against such game.

Rifles and ammunition
Weatherby continues to chamber the .257 Weatherby Magnum in several models based on both the Mark V and Vanguard action types. The Weatherby Custom Shop offers a more personalized rifle based on these actions. Remington Arms manufactures released the Special Editions of the Model 700 CDL SF and the Model 700 LSS in 2008. The Weatherby rifles have deeply blued barrels while the Remington rifles have matte stainless steel barrels.

Weatherby rifle ammunition for the .257 Weatherby Magnum is manufactured by Norma of Sweden. Conley Precision Cartridge Company manufactures several premium lines of .257 Weatherby ammunition using Barnes, Nosler, Speer, Swift and Trophy Bonded bullets. Double Tap ammunition also offers loaded ammunition for sale.

{| class="wikitable" border="1"
|+ .257 Weatherby Magnum Ammunition
|-
| style="background: #eeeeee" width="180pt" | Ammunition 
| style="background: #eeeeee" width="180pt" | Bullet
| style="background: #eeeeee" width="130pt" | Muzzle Velocity
| style="background: #eeeeee" width="130pt" | Muzzle Energy
| style="background: #eeeeee" width="195pt" | MPBR/Zero
|-
| style="background: #eeeeee" | Weatherby B25780TTSX ||  Barnes TTSX ||  ||  || /
|-
| style="background: #eeeeee" | Weatherby H25787SP ||  Hornady SP ||  ||  || /
|-
| style="background: #eeeeee" | Weatherby G257100SR ||  Norma SP ||  ||  || /
|-
| style="background: #eeeeee" | Weatherby H257100SP ||  Hornady SP ||  ||  || /
|-
| style="background: #eeeeee" | Weatherby B257100TSX ||  Barnes TSX ||  ||  || /
|-
| style="background: #eeeeee" | Weatherby N257110ACB ||  Nosler Accubond ||  ||  || /
|-
| style="background: #eeeeee" | Weatherby N257115BST ||  Nosler BT ||  ||  || /
|-
| style="background: #eeeeee" | Weatherby H257117RN ||  Hornady RN ||  ||  || /
|-
| style="background: #eeeeee" | Weatherby N257120PT ||  Nosler Partition ||  ||  || /
|-
|colspan="5" align="center" | Values courtesy of the Weatherby. MPBR/Zero values courtesy of Big Game Info.
|}

The  Weatherby N257120PT ammunition should not be used in older .257 Weatherby rifles as the twist rate is too slow to adequately stabilize the bullet. The  Weatherby H257117RN ammunition is manufactured for rifles with the slower twist rate.

Criticism
The .257 Weatherby Magnum is one of the most overbore cartridges available. The cartridge rates higher on the overbore index than the .264 Winchester Magnum and the 7mm Shooting Times Westerner but less than the 7mm RUM and the .30-378 Weatherby Magnum. The consequence of burning a large quantity of powder and driving a bullet faster is poor barrel life and throat erosion all of which affects accuracy and usable life of the firearm. Giving the barrel time to cool between each discharge of the weapon and following recommended cleaning procedures will help mitigate this issue and extend the usable life of the firearm chambered for this cartridge. Stainless steel barrels can further extend the barrel life of rifles chambered in the 257 Weatherby Magnum.

Hornady's  round nose bullet is made for such firearms which have the slower spin rate. Norma loads this bullet in the Weatherby's H257117RN ammunition for owner of such rifles who require a heavier bullet.

See also
 .25-06 Remington
 .25 WSSM
 .257 Roberts
 List of rifle cartridges
 Table of handgun and rifle cartridges

References

 The .257 Weatherby Magnum by Chuck Hawks

External links
 In Praise of the .257 Weatherby Magnum article in Shooting Times
 Ultra-Long Range Rifles and Cartridges by Chuck Hawks

Pistol and rifle cartridges
Magnum rifle cartridges
Weatherby Magnum rifle cartridges